Noor Zaheer is an Indian left leaning feminist author . Zaheer is member of Delhi Urdu Academy chaired by Arvind Kejriwal.

Literary career 
Noor Zaheer through her short stories and literature, focuses on  socioeconomic issues in a  legacy  to that of the 20th century’s progressive Urdu authors.  Zaheer  translated, ʻIṣmat Cug̲h̲tāʼī's urdu language memoir Hai Pairahan to 'The Paper Attire' in English and also directed a play 'Kahani Ki Kahani, Ismat Ki Zabaani'  in a theatre fest at Lucknow in 2017.

Social work 
Zaheer, contributes to documentation  oral culture and  restoration of  Buddhist monasteries  in Himachal Pradesh India.

Bibliography 

 Z̤ahīr, Nūr. My God is a Woman. India, Vitasta Pub., 2008. ISBN 9788189766528
 Z̤ahīr, Nūr. Ret Par Khoon. India, Meghā Buksa, 2010.
 Z̤ahīr, Nūr. Denied by Allah: Angst Against the Archaic Laws of Halala, Triple Talaq, Mut'ah & Khula. India, Vitasta Publishing, 2015.
 Z̤ahīr, Nūr. Siyahi ki ek boond. India, Medhā Buksa, 2018.
 Z̤ahīr, Nūr. Surk̲h̲a kāravām̐ ke hamasafara. India, Medhā Buksa, 2008.
 सयानी दीवानी. India, Rādhākr̥shṇa Prakāśana Prā. Li., 2020. 
 Zaheer, Noor, and Ẓahīr, Nūr. Āja ke nāma. India, Medhā Buksa, 2012.
 Zaheer, Noor. Apna Khuda Ek Aurat. India, HarperCollins Publishers India, 2015.
 Zaheer, Noor. The Language They Chose Vol. I: Women's Writing in Urdu Vol I: Fiction. India, 'Zubaan Books, 2017.
 Zaheer, Noor. The Language They Chose Vol. II: Women's Writing in Urdu Vol II: Non-Fiction. India, 'Zubaan Books, 2017.
 Koofi, Fawzia, and Zaheer, Noor. Lettres à mes filles - Entre survie et espoir, les combats de la première femme politique afghane. France, Michel Lafon, 2022.
 Cug̲h̲tāʼī, ʻIṣmat. (Translator:Zaheer, Noor) Paper Attire. Pakistan, Oxford University Press, 2016.

References 

Indian Muslims
Urdu-language writers from India
English-language writers from India
Indian feminist writers
Indian women short story writers
Translators to Urdu